United Presbyterian Center (also known as the Ecumenical Christian Ministries Building) is a historic Presbyterian church building at 1204 Oread Avenue in Lawrence, Kansas. It was built in 1959–60 in a Modern Movement style and was added to the National Register of Historic Places in 2009.

It was designed by Topeka architects Kiene & Bradley.

References

Presbyterian churches in Kansas
Churches on the National Register of Historic Places in Kansas
Churches completed in 1960
Buildings and structures in Lawrence, Kansas
National Register of Historic Places in Douglas County, Kansas